João Pedro Lopes da Silva (born 15 May 1989) is a Portuguese professional triathlete. He was European U-23 Champion in 2008, 2010 and 2011, National Junior Champion in 2006 and 2007 and the National U-23 Champion in 2008. At the 2012 Summer Olympics Silva placed 9th thus becoming the most decorated male triathlete in Portuguese history. On 23 January 2013, Silva joined S.L. Benfica's triathlon team. He won the silver medal at the 2015 European Games in Baku.

Career 
Silva was born in Benedita, Alcobaça, Portugal. At the age of seventeen Silva won his first medals at Junior World Championships and in the same year he started to take part in and to achieve top ten positions at Elite competitions.

At the World Championship Series and World Triathlon Series triathlons in Yokohama he won the gold medals in 2011 and 2012. In 2012 he also represented Portugal at the London Olympics and placed 9th.

In France, Silva takes part in the prestigious Club Championship Series Grand Prix de Triathlon. At the Grand Final in Nice, he placed 3rd in the individual ranking and 1st in the club ranking. His club Les Sables Vendee Tri is also the French Club Champion of the year 2012.

Silva studies Medicine at the Universidade Nova de Lisboa.

ITU Competitions 
In the ten years from 2003 to 2012, Silva took part in 60 ITU competitions and achieved 26 top ten positions.
The following list is based upon the official ITU Athlete's Page. Unless indicated otherwise the following competitions are triathlons and belong to the Elite category.

BG = the sponsor British Gas · DNF = did not finish · DNS = did not start

Notes

External links
  

1989 births
Living people
People from Alcobaça, Portugal
Portuguese male triathletes
S.L. Benfica (triathlon)
Triathletes at the 2015 European Games
European Games silver medalists for Portugal
European Games medalists in triathlon
Olympic triathletes of Portugal
Triathletes at the 2012 Summer Olympics
Triathletes at the 2016 Summer Olympics
Triathletes at the 2020 Summer Olympics
Sportspeople from Leiria District
20th-century Portuguese people
21st-century Portuguese people